Year 1335 (MCCCXXXV) was a common year starting on Sunday (link will display the full calendar) of the Julian calendar.

Events 
 January–December 
 May 2 – Otto the Merry, Duke of Austria, becomes Duke of Carinthia. 
 July 30 – Battle of Boroughmuir: John Randolph, 3rd Earl of Moray defeats Guy, Count of Namur in Scotland.
 November 30 – Battle of Culblean: David Bruce defeats Edward Balliol in Scotland.
 December 1 – Abu Sa'id Bahadur Khan dies, a victim of the plague that ravages the Ilkhanate. This is an early outbreak of the Black Death. His death without a clear heir caused the Ilkhanate to disintegrate.
October 22 – Ex-emperor Hanazono (95th emperor of japan) became a Zen priest.

 Date unknown 
 Georgians under King George V (the Brilliant) finally defeat the Mongolians in a decisive battle. After that George V returns the Grave of Christ from the Muslims.
 Slavery is abolished in Sweden.
 Congress of Visegrád: The monarchs of Bohemia, Hungary, and Poland form an anti-Habsburg alliance.
 Carinthia and Carniola come under Habsburg rule. After the death of Duke Henry, the duchies are bestowed by Louis the Bavarian on the Dukes of Austria. From that time onwards, what is today Slovenia is ruled jointly with Austria until 1918.
 Pope Benedict XII begins to reform the Cistercians.
 The excommunication of Frederick III of Sicily and the interdict placed on Sicily end.
 Construction begins on the papal palace in Avignon.
 Aabenraa is chartered as a city.
 The School of Arts in Zaragoza, Spain is founded (later known as the University of Zaragoza in the 16th Century).

Births 
 May 24 – Margaret of Bohemia, Queen of Hungary (d. 1349)
 October 27 – Yi Seong-gye, Korean founder of the Joseon Dynasty
 Gülçiçek Hatun, first wife of Ottoman Sultan Murad I
 Marko Mrnjavčević, de jure Serbian king
 Milica, wife of Prince Lazar of Serbia (d. 1405)
Tiphaine Raguenel, Breton astrologer (d. 1373)

Deaths 
 April 2 – Duke Henry of Carinthia
 August 12 – Prince Moriyoshi, Japanese shōgun (b. 1308)
 August 23 – Heilwige Bloemardinne, Dutch Christian mystic (b. c. 1265)
 October 31 – Marie of Évreux, French noblewoman (b. 1303)
 December 1 – Abu Sa'id Bahadur Khan, Mongol ruler of the Ilkhanate (b. 1305)

References